This list of anthropology awards is an index to articles about notable awards given for contributions to anthropology, the scientific study of humans, human behavior and societies in the past and present.  The list gives the country of the sponsoring organization, but awards may be given to people from other countries.

Awards

See also

 Lists of awards
 List of social sciences awards
 Lists of humanities awards

References

Sources
 

 
anthropology